O Carballiño is a municipality in the Spanish province of Ourense. It has a population of 13,939 (2019) and an area of 54 km2.

References 

Municipalities in the Province of Ourense